Chelyabinsk Airlines was an airline based in Chelyabinsk, Russia. It operated trunk and regional scheduled and charter passenger flights and also leased aircraft to other operators. It was formerly the Aeroflot Chelyabinsk Division. Its name was often shortened to Chelal. From 1994 the airline operated Yakovlev Yak-42 tri-jet airliners. 

Founded in 1997, the airline was absorbed by S7 Airlines in 2004.

Code data
ICAO Code: CHB

History
Chelyabinsk Airlines began international services to Hanover in July 1997 and to Frankfurt in mid-1999. The airline also flew to Turkey, Iran, Bulgaria and the United Arab Emirates, and planned to add Pakistan, Israel and Paris to its schedules. In 2004 S7 Airlines absorbed Chelyabinsk Airlines.

Fleet
The Chelyabinsk Airlines fleet consisted of 1 Tupolev Tu-134A aircraft (at January 2005).

External links
Chelyabinsk Airlines

References

Defunct airlines of Russia
Airlines established in 1997
Airlines disestablished in 2004
Companies based in Chelyabinsk